The picket boat of the Royal Navy, (also sometimes called a P1000) is a twin screw boat in use at Britannia Royal Naval College in Dartmouth primarily to train officer cadets in boat handling and seamanship.

History 
Although these boats were once carried on Royal Navy destroyers and above, they now serve only at the college in Dartmouth and can be seen flying the white or the blue ensign regularly on the River Dart and near the coast close to Start Point.

The significance of the colour of the ensigns is based on the use of the vessel, but generally when the vessel is on official Royal Navy business through the training of officer cadets then it flies the white ensign; when crewed by the Royal Fleet Auxiliary, it flies the blue ensign.

Prince William trained on picket boats as part of his officer training at Dartmouth, which he undertook from June, 2008.

Picket boats took their place in history once again by falling into place on the River Thames for the Jubilee River Pageant in 2012. On this occasion the crews were commanded by Officers on the Initial Warfare Officer Foundation Course (IWOF) at Dartmouth, and crewed by officer cadets from Lancaster Division, undergoing initial naval training.

Eight ‘Sea Class 15’ work boats by ATLAS Elektronik UK (AEUK) will replace the picket boats from autumn 2020. The first boat was delivered in November 2020.

See also
 
 
 Patrol Craft Fast - the "Swift Boats"
Scimitar-class patrol vessel

References

External links
 BBC News - Prince William starts at BRNC
 Picket boat helps stricken yacht
 Picket boats in Jubilee pageant
 Picket boats practice for Jubilee pageant

Patrol vessels of the Royal Navy
Military boats